George Kabuto (born 25 October 1955) is a Ugandan boxer. He competed in the men's light middleweight event at the 1980 Summer Olympics.

References

1955 births
Living people
Ugandan male boxers
Olympic boxers of Uganda
Boxers at the 1980 Summer Olympics
Place of birth missing (living people)
Light-middleweight boxers